Wild Bird is a 1943 German romance film directed by Johannes Meyer and starring Leny Marenbach, Volker von Collande and Werner Hinz.

The film's sets were designed by the art directors Gustav A. Knauer and Arthur Schwarz. Filming took place in Berlin and the Tyrol.

Cast
 Leny Marenbach as Vika von Demnitz
 Volker von Collande as Wolff
 Werner Hinz as Professor Lossen
 Käthe Haack as Tante Argate
 Herbert Hübner as Herr von Demnitz
 Roma Bahn as Britta von Dermnitz
 Reinhold Pasch as Dr. Schütte
 Heinrich Marlow as Präsident Weichbrodt
 Ellen Hille as Resi
 Beppo Brem as Franzl
 Josef Eichheim as Joseph
 Vera Complojer as Josefa
 Ernst Waldow as Reisender
 Hertha von Walther as Bergsteigerin
 Hanns Waschatko as Hotelportier
 Greta Schröder as Jutta Lossen

References

Bibliography 
 Rentschler, Eric. The Ministry of Illusion: Nazi Cinema and Its Afterlife. Harvard University Press, 1996.

External links 
 

1943 films
Films of Nazi Germany
German romance films
1940s romance films
1940s German-language films
Films directed by Johannes Meyer
German black-and-white films
1940s German films